The James C Purnell House is  at 504 Summit Street in Winona, Mississippi.

The house was built in 1873 by Major Frank Hawkins, a prominent business man and builder.  The architecture is a combination of Greek revival and Italianate.  Upon his death in 1896 the home fell to his daughter Mamie and her husband James C Purnell.  Mr Purnell was an important figure in early Winona. He was a businessman, philanthropist, city official and builder of Winona's first public school.  The home was placed on the National Register of Historic Places in 1990.

References

Greek Revival houses in Mississippi
Italianate architecture in Mississippi
Houses completed in 1873
Houses on the National Register of Historic Places in Mississippi
Houses in Montgomery County, Mississippi
National Register of Historic Places in Montgomery County, Mississippi
Winona, Mississippi